In the The Three Kingdoms, the history of the Wei Kingdom is recorded in the  Wajinden, and the official who held real power in the Kununokuni.

The original text of Wajinden reads.

Various theories 

 Since the Wamyō Ruijushō is written as "Kikuchi", it is thought that Kikuchi-jibei dog is "Kikuchihiko" (Japanese) and is associated with Kumamoto Prefecture Kikuchi-gun.。
 Since his name is written before Himikoko it is theorized he had the true power in Kununokuni
 Some think that the derogatory meaning is removed from the official name. The word "狗" is fierce, and is thought to be "," meaning a heroic and brave man. " means "old wisdom," but the opposite of "" is "," and it is thought to be originally ". The word "" is "Hiko," which is thought to be "" or "" or ""..

See also 

 Himikoko
 Kununokuni

External links 

 （日語）魏志倭人傳：紹熙本系百衲本掃描圖檔 （页面存档备份，存于）

References 

Wajinden
People of Yayoi-period Japan
Articles containing Japanese-language text
Pages with unreviewed translations